The 1970 United States Senate election in Washington was held on November 3, 1970. Incumbent Democrat Henry M. Jackson won a fourth term in office with a landslide victory over Republican State Senator Charles Elicker.

Blanket primary

Candidates

Democratic
Henry M. Jackson, incumbent United States Senator since 1953
Carl Maxey, Spokane attorney and anti-war activist
John "Hugo Frye" Patrick
Clarice L.R. "Tops" Privette

Republican
Wiliam H. Davis
Charles W. Elicker, State Senator from Snohomish
Robert J. "Big Bob" Odman
Bill Patrick
Howard S. Reed

Results

General election

Results

See also 
 1970 United States Senate elections

References

1970
Washington
United States Senate